David John Sully (born 29 June 1947) is a Welsh chess player, two-times Welsh Chess Championship winner (1966, 1979).

Biography
David John Sully has won two times in the Welsh Chess Championships: 1966, and 1979 (jointly).

David John Sully played for Wales in the Chess Olympiad:
 In 1974, at first reserve board in the 21st Chess Olympiad in Nice (+1, =0, -8).

References

External links

David John Sully chess games at 365chess.com

1947 births
Living people
Sportspeople from Cardiff
Welsh chess players
Chess Olympiad competitors